

Wiñaymarka Lake (also: Huiñaymarca) is the southern branch of Lake Titicaca in Bolivia and Peru.

References

External links 
 www.geonames.org / Satellite map

Lakes of Peru
Lake Titicaca
Lakes of La Paz Department (Bolivia)
Lakes of Puno Region